Hastings Highlands is a township in the Canadian province of Ontario.

Located in the northernmost portion of Hastings County, the township had a population of 4,078 in the 2016 Canadian census. Big Mink Lake is one of many lakes located in Hastings Highlands.

Communities
The township's administrative and commercial centre is the community of Maynooth, located at the junction of Highway 62 and Highway 127 north of Bancroft.

The township also comprises the communities of Baptiste, Bell Rapids, Birds Creek, Centreview, Graphite, Greenview, Hickey Settlement, Hughes, Hybla, Lake St. Peter, Maple Leaf, Maynooth Station, McAlpine Corners, McGarry Flats, Monteagle Valley, Musclow, Purdy, Scotch Bush, Scott Settlement and York River.

History

Maynooth Station was a railway station built in 1907 by the Central Ontario Railway to serve the Maynooth area. The railway was acquired by Canadian Northern Railway which later became part of the Canadian National Railway. There are a few residences near the station. This section of railway was abandoned in 1984. Maynooth Station was 15.83 rail miles north of Bancroft and 7.91 miles by rail, northward to Lake St. Peter, and 15.87 miles to end of track. The abandoned station is boarded up and fenced off. The track bed is now used as a hiking trail

The current municipality of Hastings Highlands was incorporated on January 1, 2001, by amalgamating the former townships of Bangor, Wicklow and McClure, Herschel and Monteagle.

Demographics 

Mother tongue:
 English as first language: 94.0%
 French as first language: 1.0%
 English and French as first language: 0%
 Other as first language: 5.0%

Culture

Each year on the Labour Day weekend Maynooth hosts a festival called 'Maynooth Madness' which includes the loggers games featuring local talents such as log-slicing with chainsaws and skidder operating competition. Also very popular is the 'Mud Dawg' competition involving a race through man made mud bogs. This event is usually held on the Sunday of the Labour Day Weekend. Maynooth has also become a  destination for tourists as well as area residents for its myriad of downtown antique, gift, upcycle, art and artist shops. The Arlington Hotel boasts an International Hostel and is alive with music and various events year round. It continues to offer take-out food during the pandemic.

In 2008, a group has formed with the intent of restoring the Maynooth Station and creating an interpretive centre therein. Fundraisers are held several times a year to make this dream a reality.

Lake St. Peter's economy is primarily based on tourism.  One of the OFSC snowmobile trails passes through the community.

The lakes also bring tourism to the area in the summer.  Currently the community supports one restaurant, two churches, Lake St. Peter Provincial Park, a general store and a post office.

See also
List of townships in Ontario

References

External links

Lower-tier municipalities in Ontario
Municipalities in Hastings County